The Queensland Anti-Discrimination Act 1991 is an act of the Parliament of Queensland that provides protection against unfair discrimination, sexual harassment, and other objectionable conduct. The Act was passed by the Queensland Parliament on 3 December 1991, received assent on 9 December 1991, and commenced on 30 June 1992.

Scope of the Act 
The Anti-Discrimination Act 1991 prohibits discrimination on the basis of the following attributes:
 Sex
 Relationship status
 Pregnancy
 Parental status
 Breastfeeding
 Age
 Race
 Impairment
 Religious belief or religious activity
 Political belief or activity
 Trade union activity
 Lawful sexual activity
 Gender identity
 Sexuality
 Family responsibilities
 Association with, or relation to, a person identified on the basis of any of the above attributes.

Areas 
The areas of activity where discrimination is unlawful are:
 Work and work related (includes applying for work, voluntary work, employment, work under a contract, partnerships, employment agencies, work experience and work under a training program)
 Education
 Supplying goods or services
 Accommodation (includes residential and commercial premises)
 Administration of State laws or programs (includes State government departments and statutory authorities performing functions under an Act)
 Club membership and affairs (does not include not-for-profit associations and clubs)
 Superannuation
 Insurance
 Disposing of land (e.g. selling, leasing)
 Local government members (between local government members performing official functions, except on the basis of political belief or activity).

Anti-Discrimination Commission Queensland 
The implementation of the Act saw the establishment of the Anti-Discrimination Commission Queensland, an independent statutory body to resolve complaints of discrimination, sexual harassment, vilification, victimisation and other contraventions of the Anti-Discrimination Act, as well as to promote an understanding, acceptance, and public discussion of human rights in Queensland.

Legacy 
In 2016, the Anti-Discrimination Commission Queensland and State Library of Queensland marked the 25th anniversary of the establishment of the Act, by creating seven short videos exploring the impact of the Act on Queenslanders and feature interviews with activists, politicians, community advocates and social justice professionals.

See also 
 List of anti-discrimination acts

References

External links 
 Anti-Discrimination Act 1991
 25 years of the Anti-Discrimination Act 1991
 Reflecting on 25 Years of the Anti-Discrimination Act Digital Stories Collection, State Library of Queensland
 Anti-Discrimination Commission Queensland
Anti-discrimination law in Australia
Queensland legislation
History of Queensland
1991 in Australian law
1990s in Queensland